Buffalo Pound Lake  is a eutrophic prairie lake in Saskatchewan, Canada, formed from glaciation about 10,000 years ago, on the Qu'Appelle River approximately  north of Moose Jaw and  north-east of Tuxford. The lake gets its name from the method used by First Nations people to capture the bison using the natural topography as corrals or buffalo pounds. Bison, once numbering more than 60 million on the prairies but almost extinct by 1900, were reintroduced into the area in 1972.

The lake provides drinking water for the cities of Regina, Moose Jaw, and the Mosaic Company potash mine at Belle Plaine, approximately 25% of the province's population. It is also used for recreational purposes such as camping, boating, and fishing and is home to a host of fish species including walleye, sauger, yellow perch, northern pike, cisco, mooneye, lake whitefish, white sucker, channel catfish, burbot, bigmouth buffalo, and common carp. Buffalo Pound Provincial Park is located on the southern part of the lake and can be accessed by Highway 202 and Highway 301. Log cabins can be rented or bought along the shores of the lake.

Highway 2 crosses by causeway on the lake.

Buffalo Pound Dam 
The Qu'Appelle River was dammed  by the Buffalo Pound Dam in 1939 to control fluctuating water levels.

A fish ladder installed in 1999-2000 allows fish to migrate in and out of the lake and new gates were installed to create a better water supply downstream. The height of the dam was also raised one metre. The problem with fluctuating water levels wasn't solved all together until the construction of the Qu'Appelle River Dam and Gardiner Dam that created Lake Diefenbaker 100 km upstream in 1967. As a result, water flow in the Qu'Appelle River now remains relatively constant. This, however, has flushed the lake out and allowed excessive algae growth, which reduced the popularity of swimming and boating during the summer months and raised the cost of water treatment. The lake remains eutrophic, due to low oxygen levels and highly nutritious soil on the lake's bottom.

NCC's Buffalo Pound 
Buffalo Pound is a Nature Conservancy of Canada (NCC) property located on the northern shore of Buffalo Pound Lake. In 2020, the NCC bought the land for $3.38-million. About 30%, or $987,000, was contributed by K+S Potash Canada offset grassland destroyed in Saskatchewan by mine construction. The rest of the money came from the Canadian and Saskatchewan governments and hundreds of private donors. The land was purchased from local cattle ranchers and cattle will continue to graze the land.

The total land area of the park is 866 hectares (2,140 acres) with 7 kilometres of shoreline along the lake. It consists mostly of native grasslands and provides habitat to a variety of wildlife, including animals on Canada's Species at Risk Act, such as the American badger, Baird’s sparrow, bobolink, northern leopard frog, and Sprague’s pipit.

Buffalo Pound Lake Research Observatory 
Researchers have been monitoring conditions at Buffalo Pound Lake for more than 20 years. Since 2017, the Global Water Futures program has studied the lake and the Qu'Appelle Watershed, modeling environmental changes that could affect the supply of clean drinking water.

See also 
Saskatchewan Water Security Agency
Dams and reservoirs in Saskatchewan
List of lakes of Saskatchewan
List of protected areas of Saskatchewan
Fishing Lakes

References

External links 

Lakes of Saskatchewan
Dams in Saskatchewan